The Menderes barbel (Luciobarbus kottelati) is a species of ray-finned fish in the genus Luciobarbus from the Büyük Menderes River basin in Turkey.

The fish is named in honor of Swiss ichthyologist Maurice Kottelat (b. 1957), because of his contributions to the knowledge of European and Asian fishes.

References 

 

kottelati
Endemic fauna of Turkey
Taxa named by Davut Turan, 
Taxa named by Fitnat Güler Ekmekçi
Taxa named by Ali İlhan
Taxa named by Semih Engin
Fish described in 2008